Hit and Run Productions is a movie production house in the United Kingdom founded by Tony Smith and Hilary Shor. It is an extension of Hit & Run Music Publishing.

Filmography 

 Phil Collins: No Jacket Required (1985) (television) - Executive Producer (Smith only)
 Mike + The Mechanics: A Closer Look (1989) (video) - Executive Producer (Smith only)
  Genesis: A History  (1990) Hit and Run Productions
 Beautopia (1998) (motion picture) - Executive Producers
 Eye of the Beholder (1999) (motion picture) - Producers
 Children of Men (2006) (motion picture) - Producers
 The Possibility of Hope (2007) (video documentary) - Executive Producers
 Black Oasis (2008) - (motion picture) - Producers

Film production companies of the United Kingdom